Wolverine and the X-Men is a 2009 American animated series by Marvel Studios. It is the fourth of five animated adaptations of the X-Men characters, the other four being Pryde of the X-Men, X-Men: The Animated Series, X-Men: Evolution, and an anime adaptation known simply as X-Men.

Plot
The story begins with Wolverine and Rogue having an argument about him leaving. When Wolverine goes to Charles and Jean Grey, they get headaches. An explosion occurs, and Charles and Jean disappear. The resulting trauma caused the X-Men team to disband and go their separate ways, leaving Xavier's once highly revered league of mutant peace preservers out of commission.

Due to the loss of the Professor, Jean, and severe damage to the mansion, many of the X-Men have withered in their faith towards the stability of their former team and have since detached themselves from their former community. Some examples include Cyclops' subsequent isolation resulting from Jean's disappearance, Storm's relocation back to her home continent of Africa, and Iceman's move back into his parents' home in the quiet suburbs.

One year later, the MRD (short for the Mutant Response Division), a government-supported organization created for the detainment and subsequent registration of existing mutants, begins capturing mutants from all over the country in response to the countless human protesters determined to protect the safety of humankind. This course of action causes Wolverine and Beast to ally and resolve to bring the once defunct X-Men team back together again.

Meanwhile, Rogue is in the street and attacked by the Brotherhood of Mutants. They trick her into joining them, and she later smiles devilishly as she enters their base, appearing to have switched allegiance to become an evil mutant. Thanks to the generosity, wealth, and resourcefulness of Angel, the slowly reforming X-Men team begins to see a promising return to its former glory with the rejoining of junior members Iceman, Shadowcat and Forge along with the reconstruction of the previously demolished Xavier Institute. Unfortunately, without the necessary capabilities of a competent telepath to operate Cerebro, the possibility of locating some of the more globally scattered X-Men members along with the missing Charles Xavier and Jean seems all but a pipe dream.

Fortunately, this problem does not last for very long when Emma Frost, the beautiful former Headmistress of a now inactive mutant school of her own in Massachusetts, makes a surprising appearance on the doorstep of the Mansion with an interesting proposal: membership with the X-Men in exchange for utilizing her telepathy to pinpoint the missing Xavier's whereabouts. Upon the team's – and particularly Wolverine's – reluctant acceptance of the offer, Emma's efforts prove successful as she is able to locate a comatose Charles on the shores of Genosha in the care of Magneto. After their arrival on Genosha and a short confrontation with the Master of Magnetism himself, Magneto eventually permits the X-Men to take his old friend's body back to the sanctity of the Mansion where he is certain that Xavier will be placed in proper care. Upon their return, Xavier telepathically contacts the X-Men twenty years from the present in an alternate dystopian future and informs Wolverine that he is to lead and reunite the X-Men if they wish to successfully prevent the inevitable war that will cause the world to fall under the domination of Master Mold and the Sentinels.

Throughout the course of the entire season, Emma's role as the X-Men's primary acting telepath enables the team to relocate the rest of the other members in the hopes of reforming once again and assisting in Xavier's cause. While some were met with initial hesitancy such as with Nightcrawler, others such as Storm were more than willing to accept the offer once Xavier's vision had been put into perspective. The X-Men overcome many hardships and obstacles along the way, eventually achieving their ultimate goal of locating Jean and finally discovering the truth surrounding the mystery of what caused the Mansion's explosion, along with Xavier and Jean's subsequent disappearances.

Meanwhile, Magneto welcomes new mutants to Genosha, one of whom is Nightcrawler. Magneto claims that Genosha is a safe and secure area for mutants, rather than a threat. At first Nightcrawler believes this, but upon closer inspection, Genosha is exposed as a method to use mutants' powers by Magneto. Nightcrawler eventually escapes, but is captured by Mystique when he arrives back at the mansion.

Elsewhere, Wolverine begins to have some visions from the past, and Emma offers to sort out his visions telepathically.  In his visions, Wolverine meets a lone mutant girl, figure from the past Sabretooth, and finally discovers many mysteries about his past. Cyclops has constant memories about Jean and is depressed.  He believes she is still alive, so, with the help of Emma, he seeks out Mister Sinister. The X-Men and Mister Sinister have a confrontation that does not result in them finding out any new info about Jean's whereabouts. Wolverine has Cyclops swear an oath to be in the X-Men again and promise not to go off searching for Jean. Somewhere across town, Jean is shown waking up in a random hospital after months of being in a coma.

It is later revealed in the three-part first-season finale "Foresight" that the previously assumed attack on the Mansion was not from the efforts of a third party, but rather from the result of Jean who unwittingly releases the immense and highly destructive strength and power of the Phoenix Force, that originally lay dormant deep within her subconscious, in an attempt to halt an oncoming telepathic attack led by Emma (who was secretly working as a double agent for the Inner Circle and the Stepford Cuckoos). Along with Sebastian Shaw, Selene, Harry Leland, and Donald Pierce, it was the Inner Circle's utmost duty to not only obtain the power of the Phoenix Force by abducting Jean from the protection of Xavier and the Mansion, but to also obliterate the ancient being's existence before it could fully mature and consequently bring forth unparalleled destruction onto the world as it had done numerous times in the past throughout Earth's history. However, in a move that was completely unknown to Emma at the time, the rest of the Inner Circle members all shared an entirely different and more sinister vision than Frost had initially believed: to control and manipulate the power of the Phoenix Force and have it cater to their own hidden agenda. Upon realizing the error of her ways, Emma betrays the Inner Circle and attempts to redeem herself in the eyes of the X-Men by not only rescuing Jean but, by also following through with her original plan of destroying the cosmic entity before it could mature. Unfortunately, her actions result in her apparent death. Rogue apologizes to Wolverine, and finally rejoins the X-Men for good. The now fully reformed X-Men are praised for their actions by Professor Xavier, but are warned of a new danger approaching: the Age of Apocalypse.

Characters
The overall situations and the look of the series and character designs were inspired by the Astonishing X-Men comic series.

X-Men

X-Men (present)
 Logan Howlett / Wolverine (Leader)
 Scott Summers / Cyclops
 Emma Frost / White Queen
 Henry "Hank" McCoy / Beast (Second-in-Command)
 Ororo Munroe / Storm
 Kurt Wagner / Nightcrawler
 Warren Worthington III / Angel
 Kitty Pryde / Shadowcat
 Bobby Drake / Iceman
 Anna-Marie D'Ancanto / Rogue
 Piotr Rasputin / Colossus
 Jean Grey / Dark Phoenix
 Jonathon Silvercloud / Forge

X-Men (future)

 Charles Xavier / Professor X
 Lucas Bishop / Bishop
 Ray Carter / Berzerker
 Neena Thurman / Domino
 Julian Keller / Hellion
 Kamal
 Sarah Rushman / Marrow
 Lorna Dane / Polaris (Magneto's daughter, and Quicksilver and Scarlet Witch's younger sister)
 "Rover" (a Sentinel who has befriended the future X-Men)
 Telford Porter / Vanisher
 Logan Howlett / Wolverine
 Laura Kinney / X-23 (Wolverine's female clone)

Brotherhood of Mutants

 Pietro Maximoff / Quicksilver (Magneto's son, Scarlet Witch's twin brother, and Polaris' older brother)
 Dominikos Petrakis / Avalanche
 Fred Dukes / Blob
 Mortimer Toynbee / Toad
 Neena Thurman / Domino
 Anna-Marie D'Ancanto / Rogue

Acolytes

 Erik Lehnsherr / Magneto
 Raven Darkholme / Mystique
 Wanda Maximoff / Scarlet Witch (Magneto's daughter, Quicksilver's twin sister, and Polaris' older sister)
 Lorna Dane / Polaris 
 Sarah Ryall / Scanner
 John Allerdyce / Pyro
 Clarice Ferguson / Blink
 Cain Marko / Juggernaut
 Cessily Kincaid / Mercury
 Seamus Mellencamp
 Suvik Senyaka
 Kleinstock Brothers

Marauders

 Nathaniel Essex / Mister Sinister
 Phillippa Sontag / Arclight
 Michael Baer / Blockbuster
 Nathan Christopher Charles Summers / Cable (Cyclops's and Jean Gray's son and Rachel's half-brother)
 Kodiak Noatak / Harpoon
 Jamie Madrox / Multiple Man
 Vertigo
 Warren Worthington III / Archangel

Inner Circle

 Sebastian Shaw
 Donald Pierce
 Harry Leland
 Selene Gallio
 Emma Frost
 Stepford Cuckoos

MRD/Project: Wideawake

 Sen. Robert Kelly
 Warren Worthington II (father of Angel)
 Bolivar Trask
 The Sentinels
 The Prowlers
 Master Mold
 Dr. Sybil Zane
 Colonel Moss
 Dr. Kavita Rao
 Agent Haskett
 Dr. Peterson

Weapon X

 Truett Hudson / Prof. Andre Thorton
 Dr. Abraham Cornelius
 Victor Creed / Sabretooth
 Christoph Nord / Maverick
 Laura Kinney / X-23
 Logan Howlett / Wolverine
 Raven Darkholme / Mystique

Other mutants

 En Sabah Nur / Apocalypse
 Ashley Crawford / Big Bertha
 Tabitha Smith / Boom Boom
 Amando Munoz / Darwin
 Alison Blaire / Dazzler
 Mark Sheppard / DJ
 Sooraya Qadir / Dust
 Maria Callasantos / Feral
 Fever Pitch
 Angelica Jones / Firestar
 Remy LeBeau / Gambit
 Hope Summers 
 Jubilation Lee / Jubilee
 Monet St. Croix / M
 M-Twins
 Madelyne Pryor
 Alison Crestmere / Magma
 Sarah Vale / Network
 Robert Hunter / Nitro
 Christy Nord / Petra (Maverick's daughter)
 Megan Gwynn / Pixie
 Betsy Braddock / Psylocke
 Max Jordan / Quill
 Rachel Summers (Cyclops' and Jean Grey's daughter, and Cable's half-sister)
 Santo Vaccarro / Rockslide
 Jennifer Stavros / Roulette
 Karl Lykos / Sauron
 Amahl Farouk / Shadow King
 Shatter
 Kenuichio Hirada / Silver Samurai
 Sammy Paré / Squidboy
 Noriko Ashida / Surge
 Everett Thomas / Synch
 John Proudstar / Thunderbird
 Tildie Soames
 Hope Abbott / Trance
 Vanessa Carlysle
 Venkat Katregadda / Vindaloo
 John Lopez / Washout
 Nicholas Gleason / Wolf Cut
 Rahne Sinclair / Wolfsbane
 Meghan Puceanu

Supporting characters

 Mojo
 Spiral
 The Reavers
 Nick Fury
 Bruce Banner / Hulk
 Wendigo
 Mariko Yashida

Episodes

Voice cast

Main voice cast

 Steve Blum – Wolverine / Logan, Vanisher, Vindaloo, Fever Pitch
 Susan Dalian – Storm, Dr. Kavita Rao, Jean Grey's Nurse
 Jennifer Hale – Jean Grey, Boom Boom
 Danielle Judovits – Shadowcat, Tildie Soames
 Tom Kane – Magneto, Professor Thorton
 Yuri Lowenthal – Iceman
 Nolan North – Cyclops, Colossus, Pyro, Berzerker
 Liam O'Brien – Angel / Archangel, Nightcrawler, Nitro
 Roger Craig Smith – Forge, Hellion, Kamal, Rover the Sentinel
 Fred Tatasciore – Beast, Hulk, Blockbuster, Juggernaut, Harpoon
 Kieren van den Blink – Rogue
 Kari Wahlgren – Emma Frost, Magma, Dr. Sybil Zane, Kristie Nord
 Neil Denis - Spyke and Cable
 Jim Ward – Professor X, Warren Worthington II, Abraham Cornelius, Sentinels

Additional voices 

 Charlie Adler – Mojo, The Reavers
 Tamara Bernier – Mystique
 Clancy Brown – Mister Sinister
 Benjamin Bryan – Young Scott Summers
 A. J. Buckley – Toad
 Corey Burton – John Grey
 Grey DeLisle – Psylocke, Spiral, Network
 Alex Désert – Nick Fury
 Richard Doyle – Senator Robert Kelly
 Chris Edgerly – Agent Haskett
 Crispin Freeman – Multiple Man, Maverick
 Kate Higgins – Scarlet Witch, Pixie
 Mark Hildreth – Quicksilver
 Michael Ironside – Colonel Moss
 Dominic Janes – Squidboy
 Phil LaMarr – Gambit, Bolivar Trask
 Peter Lurie – Sabretooth
 Gabriel Mann – Dr. Bruce Banner
 Vanessa Marshall – Vertigo
 Graham McTavish – Sebastian Shaw
 Liza del Mundo – Polaris
 Laraine Newman – Marjorie
 Kevin Michael Richardson – Shadow King, Bishop
 James Sie – Yakuza Leader, Sensei Ogun
 André Sogliuzzo – Arclight
 Stephen Stanton – Blob
 April Stewart – Selene
 Tara Strong – Marrow, Dust, Firestar, X-23, Stepford Cuckoos
 James Patrick Stuart – Avalanche
 Gwendoline Yeo – Domino, Master Mold, Mariko Yashida
 Keone Young – Silver Samurai

Production
Toonz Animation India and First Serve International formed a joint venture Toonz First Serve to produce Wolverine. By November 2007, Toonz First Serve began production on the series.

On November 4, 2008, a second season, consisting of 26 episodes was confirmed as being in production by Toonz Entertainment and Marvel Animation. During Comic Con 2009, images of season 2 were shown, consisting of Bastion, Cable, Colossus, Deadpool, Havok, Jubilee, and Magik. It was announced that these characters were to appear in season 2. Colossus was set to receive a reintroductory storyline and would have been a regular character in season 2. Joshua Fine also revealed that Holocaust, Sunfire, and Unus The Untouchable would have made appearances in season 2. Joshua Fine confirmed that Deadpool would have been in a Weapon X episode also featuring X-23 / Laura Kinney, and other obscure characters.

Cancellation
On April 13, 2010, Comics Continuum reported that (according to an inside source) a second season seemed very unlikely. On April 15, 2010, Marvel Animation Age confirmed the recent report that Wolverine and the X-Men would not be returning for a second season. The reason for this was due to financial problems with their financing partner due to Disney purchasing Marvel while Fox owned the movie rights to the X-Men.

Later allusions in other Marvel media
 Steven Blum, Tom Kane, and Fred Tatasciore reprise their respective roles as Wolverine, Professor Thornton, and Hulk in Hulk Vs. Wolverine (a prequel to the series). 
 Alex Désert, Gabriel Mann, Tatasciore, Blum, and Kane all reprise their respective roles as Nick Fury, Bruce Banner, Hulk, Wolverine and Professor Thornton in The Avengers: Earth's Mightiest Heroes.
 The MRD is also mentioned in passing in The Avengers: Earth's Mightiest Heroes.
 Nolan North reprises his role as Cyclops in the animated series Black Panther.
 Blum, Liam O'Brien, Jim Ward, and Kane each return as Wolverine, Nightcrawler, Professor X, and Magneto in Marvel Super Hero Squad: The Video Game. But only Blum and Ward reprise their characters for The Super Hero Squad Show.
 Blum, Tara Strong, Kane, Susan Dalian, Jennifer Hale, and Ward return as the voices of Wolverine, X-23, Magneto, Storm, Jean Grey, and Sentinel in Marvel vs. Capcom 3: Fate of Two Worlds and Ultimate Marvel vs. Capcom 3.
 Blum, North, Phil LaMarr, and Kari Wahlgren return to voice Wolverine, Cyclops, Gambit, and Emma Frost in X-Men: Destiny.
 Blum, Hale, and Tatasciore reprise their roles of Wolverine, Jean Grey, and Beast in Marvel Anime: X-Men while Gwendoline Yeo reprises her role of Mariko Yashida in Marvel Anime: Wolverine.
 Blum, Kate Higgins, O'Brien, Tatasciore, Wahlgren, and Ward return as Wolverine, Scarlet Witch, Nightcrawler, Beast, Hulk, Emma Frost, and Professor X in Marvel Heroes.
 Blum, Kane, Higgins, and O'Brien reprise their respective roles as Wolverine, Magneto, Scarlet Witch, and Nightcrawler in Marvel: Ultimate Alliance 3: The Black Order.
 Tatasciore also reprises his roles as Hulk and Beast in Marvel: Ultimate Alliance 3: The Black Order.

Broadcast history

United States
On May 1, 2008, the show was pre-sold to Nicktoons Network in the United States and was set for a Spring 2009 airdate. It was also confirmed in an article by USA Today's website in which it specifically mentions the cartoon starting on January 23, 2009, on Nicktoons Network. On January 23, 2009, the show premiered in the United States, with the first two episodes shown back-to-back on Nicktoons Network, which were re-aired on Nickelodeon two days later. The next 6 episodes followed weekly before a two-month break. New episodes began on May 22, 2009, as advertised with commercials on the channel then stopped after June 19, 2009, till the network advertised that they will be showing new episodes on July 31, 2009, after or before new episodes of Iron Man: Armored Adventures.

United Kingdom
On June 23, 2008, a second preview for the series, starring the main X-Men team, was released to announce the special screening of the 3-part pilot episodes that aired at the San Diego Comic-Con in late July 2008. Press releases indicated that the first episode was due to premiere on August 2, 2008, on BBC Two in the UK, however, it was postponed and premiered on January 4, 2009, on the CBBC Channel. Initially, one new episode aired every Sunday, but on January 25, 2009, CBBC started airing two new episodes every Sunday. The time slots varied, and the episodes were available for viewing on the BBC iPlayer for a limited time after they aired. As of mid-February 2009, some new episodes were shown on weekdays instead of at the weekend. Some episodes with scenes showing heavy violence were censored and Episode 17 was not shown on CBBC as there was a duel to the death in the storyline (along with one scene depicting blood). CBBC in the UK overtook Canada on March 4, 2009, when it aired the 20th episode, "Breakdown.”

In 2009, BBC Alba started broadcasting the series dubbed into Scottish Gaelic as "An Sionnach Sgianach is Na Seòid".

The show later aired on Kix, beginning in November 2013.

Canada

Early news had speculated the show to air in Fall 2008 in the United States. The series started airing on YTV on Saturday, September 6, 2008, in the 7:00 p.m. time slot. When its time slot was switched to Saturday morning programming, Crunch, it aired at 11:30 a.m. Starting in January 2009, the show was also shown on Teletoon, where only episodes that previously aired on YTV were shown.

Latin America and Brazil
In July 2008, the series was pre-sold to Jetix. starting August 25, 2008 from Mondays to Thursdays at 4:30 p.m. Unusually, all 26 episodes of the first season were aired in Brazil and Latin America before the series started in any other country. Also, the series airs in Rede Record in Brazil from Mondays to Fridays at 7:00 p.m., starting November 9, 2009. In Mexico, the series aired on Azteca 7.

Australia
In Australia, the first series aired on ABC1 Sunday mornings. The series was then repeated weekdays in early morning and late afternoon timeslots. The show then aired on ABC3, along with other series from Marvel Animation on Sunday nights.

Merchandise
Hasbro produced a Wolverine and the X-Men toyline as a tie-in to the series. The first wave consisted of Avalanche, Beast, Colossus, Cyclops, Logan (not in classic outfit), Iceman, Magneto, and Wolverine. Wave two contained the new figures Nightcrawler and a Black Uniform Wolverine. Wave Three, the final wave, added Forge and Toad to the line. The toy line ended before any of the main females of the series were turned into toys; notably missing were Emma Frost, Jean Grey, Shadowcat, Rogue, and Storm.

Reception
Due in part to the abundance of advertising for the series done by Nicktoons and Marvel, the Nicktoons premiere of Wolverine and the X-Men garnered over 3,500,000 viewers, one of the network's highest ratings ever.

 Hindsight, Part One – 3,436,000 viewers
 Hindsight, Part Two – 4,589,000 viewers

Home media

United Kingdom
The first announced DVD was a UK release by Liberation Entertainment, which was set to be released in November 2008 However, the UK branch of Liberation closed, leaving the release cancelled. E1 Entertainment finally released the series starting with a Volume 1 release featuring the first 7 episodes in April 2009. The second volume was released on October 19, 2009, to coincide with the release of X-Men Origins: Wolverine on DVD. This volume contained an additional 7 episodes. On February 8, 2010, Volume 3 was released containing the next 6 episodes, leaving the last 6 episodes to be released in Volume 4 on July 26, 2010.  The complete boxed set with all twenty-six episodes was released on July 11, 2011.

United States
The holder of the DVD license for the show in the US is Lionsgate Entertainment (who partners with Marvel Animation). On April 21, 2009, they released Volume 1: Heroes Return Trilogy featuring the first three episodes. The next release, Volume 2: Deadly Enemies came out on July 21, 2009, and features the next five episodes. Volume 3: Beginning of the End was released on November 3, 2009, with five more episodes. Volume 4: Fate of the Future was released on February 2, 2010, with five more episodes. Volume 5: Revelation was released on May 4, 2010, along with Volume 5 of X-Men: The Animated Series. Marvel formally announced the sixth and final part of the series, Volume 6: Final Crisis Trilogy was released on August 17, 2010. The complete series was released on DVD on October 12, 2010. The entire series was later put on Disney+.

Canada
Liberation Entertainment released a single-disc "Season 1: Chapter 1" package on April 14, 2009, with the first four episodes of the series. A second single disc package, "Season 1: Chapter 2" holding the next four episodes was released on July 21, 2009, although the packaging mentioned a fifth episode that was not included for unknown reasons. Also, a 5-disc set of the complete first season in Steelbook packaging was released September 15, 2009. The set includes all 26 episodes in widescreen format, character bios, an image gallery and an audio commentary on the episode Overflow.

Mexico
Buena Vista Home Entertainment Mexico announced the release of the first DVD R4 containing the initial 6 episodes by Fall 2008.

As of May 2009, the whole 26 episodes of the first season were available in different stores. A Wolverine comic was packed with the DVD set as part of the promotional merchandise for the release of X-Men Origins: Wolverine.

Australia
Magna Home Entertainment has announced that the full first season (26 episodes) has been released in Australia with a Limited Edition Wolverine Mold Case. Wolverine and the X-Men: X-Calibre (6 Episodes) and Wolverine and the X-Men: Wolverine VS The Hulk (6 Episodes) has been released with Wolverine and the X-Men: Hunting Grounds (7 Episodes) released on July 8, 2009. Wolverine and the X-Men: Breakdown (7 Episodes).

Bulgaria
Wolverine and the X-Men was going to be released on DVD, but there is still no information about any date. The trailer can be seen on the Biker Mice from Mars Season 1 DVD.

Russia
The whole series was released on DVD in Russia.

Italy
Panini Comics released the first season under its Panini Video imprint. It was the last DVD published by Panini.

References

External links

 

2009 American television series debuts
2009 American television series endings
2000s American animated television series
Marvel Animation
X-Men television series
Animated television series based on Marvel Comics
Animated series produced by Marvel Studios
American children's animated action television series
American children's animated adventure television series
American children's animated science fantasy television series
American children's animated superhero television series
Anime-influenced Western animated television series
Wolverine (comics) in other media
Works by Christopher Yost
English-language television shows
Nicktoons (TV network) original programming
Television shows based on Marvel Comics